Caroline Amalie of Schleswig-Holstein-Sonderburg-Augustenburg (28 June 1796 – 9 March 1881) was Queen of Denmark as the second spouse of King Christian VIII between 1839 and 1848.

Life

Early life

Caroline Amalie was the daughter of Frederick Christian II, Duke of Schleswig-Holstein-Sonderburg-Augustenburg, and Princess Louise Auguste of Denmark; Caroline Amalie's mother was the only daughter of Christian VII and his British wife, Queen Caroline Matilde, after whom she was named. She was born in Copenhagen and lived there until 1807, when she moved with her family to Augustenborg. She was given a conventional education for an upper class female of her time.

In the conflict between her parents - who disagreed politically and personally - she sided with her mother; Louise Auguste retained an ongoing close relationship with her brother, the king of Denmark, as well as with the Danish court.

Marriage
Her mother introduced her to the heir presumptive to the Danish throne, the future Christian VIII, and encouraged them to marry.  Reportedly, Caroline Amalie fell in love with Christian, who found her attractive.

Christian had divorced his first spouse Charlotte Fredericka of Mecklenburg-Schwerin in 1810 on grounds of adultery.   In 1814, he had just returned to Denmark after his abdication of the Norwegian throne. The same year, Christian and Caroline Amalie were engaged. The wedding took place in 1815.

Between 1816 and 1817, the couple lived in Odense, where Christian served as Governor of Fionia. Between 1818 and 1822, they undertook numerous trips through Europe together. They visited various resorts in an attempt to cure their inability to have children.
Christian devoted himself to the sciences, mineralogy and geology in particular. While Christian became celebrated for his scientific interests, Caroline Amalie was a composer who wrote numerous piano pieces.

The personal relationship between Caroline Amalie and Christian was described as harmonious and as an image of the contemporary ideal of marriage. Her acceptance of her spouse's infidelity was regarded as something suitable and appropriate within contemporary gender roles. Her amiable personality made her respected and well liked by the rest of the royal House, and she is described as a good stepmother of her stepson Frederick.

Queen

In 1839, when King Frederick VI died, Caroline Amalie, as the wife of Christian VIII, became Queen of Denmark. She was considered instrumental in the pro-German party on the matter of the duchies of Schleswig-Holstein.

Early on, Caroline Amalie was active within philanthropy. She founded the poor house Dronning Caroline Amalies Asyl in Copenhagen in 1829, the poor house Dronningens Asyl in Odense in 1836, the Kvindelig Plejeforening for sick and women in childbirth in 1843. Her charitable projects for poor orphans gave her the name "The Poor Children's Mother" and "The Royal Foster mother of the Little Ones". As hereditary princess and later as queen, she used her position to launch the charitable role as a role model for the female members of the nobility and upper classes, which called for upper-class women to be actively involved in society through philanthropy. By doing so, women found a public and political role acceptable to combine with the popular 19th-century role of a Christian wife and mother in Danish society. Her introduction of a new role model for women is considered to have had great impact on Danish society.

Caroline Amalie was a follower of the religious ideas of N. F. S. Grundtvig, whose movement she actively supported, such as the Grundtvigian priests P.O. Boisen and Peder Rørdam. In 1841, she founded an orphanage, Dronning Caroline Amalies Asylskole, whose school was inspired by the ideas of Grundtvig. She was not described as an intellectual herself, however she regarded it as a duty to introduce the representatives of art and literature at court and act as their supporter.

It is not clear whether or not she ever exerted any influence in state affairs. During the conflict between Denmark and the duchies of Schleswig and Holstein, her brothers, Christian August of Augustenborg and Frederick of Nør, came to be in opposition against Christian VIII and Denmark. This caused a difficult situation for Caroline Amalie, who was suspected for conspiring with her brothers against Danish interests, especially by the nationalistic liberals in Copenhagen. This made her unpopular and exposed to some hostility during the last years of Christian's reign.

Queen Dowager

Caroline Amalie became a widow in 1848 and survived her spouse for more than thirty years.  She took up residence at Sorgenfri Castle north of Copenhagen, but due to ill health she preferred to spend winters in southern Europe.  She also outlived her stepson by seventeen years. Hence she lived to see Christian IX become king with her niece Louise of Hesse-Kassel as queen. She was a godmother of two future Kings (Christian X of Denmark and Haakon VII of Norway) and a future Empress (Maria Feodorovna).

During her life as a queen dowager, she enjoyed more popularity than she did as queen. She continued with her charitable projects: in 1852, she took over as protector of the charitable women's society Det Kvindelige Velgørende Selskab after queen dowager Marie, and in 1863, she encouraged queen Louise to open the deaconess institution.

She died in 1881 and was buried at Roskilde Cathedral next to Christian VIII.

Ancestry

References

Citations

Bibliography 

 
 Dansk Kvindebiografisk Leksikon

External links 

 Queen Caroline Amalie at the website of the Royal Danish Collection at Rosenborg Castle

1796 births
1881 deaths
19th-century Danish nobility
Danish royal consorts
Duchesses of Saxe-Lauenburg
Grand Commanders of the Order of the Dannebrog
Caroline Amalie
Burials at Roskilde Cathedral